Gary Eck is an Australian comedian and actor.

Career
Gary Eck has starred in several Australian movies, including 2003's You Can't Stop The Murders (which he had written for as well) and The Night We Called It A Day, and also in 2006's BoyTown. Eck has also appeared in several short films.

In 2007, Eck appeared as himself on a regular basis on The Nation, a television show that aired on Channel Nine (alongside Mick Molloy as host).

Eck has done comedy on several shows, including Good News Week, Joker Poker and The Footy Show. One of Eck's performances at Sydney's Comedy Store is the basis for his stand-up CD, Gary Eck Live!

In 2010, Eck, alongside George Miller wrote a screenplay for Happy Feet Two. The film was released on 18 November 2011. He also provided additional voices.

Awards

ARIA Music Awards
The ARIA Music Awards are a set of annual ceremonies presented by Australian Recording Industry Association (ARIA), which recognise excellence, innovation, and achievement across all genres of the music of Australia. They commenced in 1987. 

! 
|-
| ARIA Music Awards of 2004 || The Hollywood Motel (with Lee Perry) || ARIA Award for Best Comedy Release ||  || 
|-

Early life
Eck was schooled in Canberra, attending Latham Primary School, Belconnen High School and Hawker College.

References

External links
 http://www.garyeck.com

Year of birth missing (living people)
Living people
Australian male comedians
Australian film directors
People educated at Hawker College